The Shire of Minhamite was a local government area about  west of Melbourne, the state capital of Victoria, Australia.

History

Minhamite, initially part of the Shire of Belfast, was incorporated as a shire on 13 January 1871.

On 23 September 1994, the Shire of Minhamite was abolished, and along with the Borough of Port Fairy, the Shire of Belfast, parts of the Shires of Dundas, Mortlake, Mount Rouse, Warrnambool, and the Tower Hill Reserve, was merged into the newly created Shire of Moyne.

Ridings
The Shire of Minhamite was not divided into ridings, and its nine councillors represented the entire shire.

Towns and localities
 Bessiebelle
 Broadwater
 Hawkesdale
 Knebsworth
 Macarthur
 Minhamite*
 Orford
 St Helens
 Tarrone
 Warrong
 Willatook

* Council seat.

Population

* Estimate in the 1958 Victorian Year Book.

References

External links
 Victorian Places - Minhamite Shire

Minhamite
1871 establishments in Australia
1994 disestablishments in Australia